Lowcock is a surname. Notable people with the surname include:

Henry Lowcock ( 1837–1901), British businessman
Mark Lowcock (born 1962), British civil servant

See also
Locock

Surnames of Welsh origin
Surnames of English origin